Thornton Lakes are located in North Cascades National Park, in the U. S. state of Washington. Thornton Lakes can be accessed on foot from a trailhead in Ross Lake National Recreation Area. The hike of  includes a  altitude gain and a  descent to Lower Thornton Lake. Two other lakes lie above the first one, unofficially named Middle and Upper Thornton Lakes. A designated backcountry camping zone is located at Lower Thornton Lake.

References

Lakes of Washington (state)
North Cascades National Park
Lakes of Whatcom County, Washington